The British Athletics Championships is the premier national championship in track and field held in the United Kingdom, and are organised by British Athletics. The event has doubled as the main trials meet for international team selection for major events in which Great Britain and Northern Ireland compete, including the Olympic Games, the IAAF World Championships in Athletics and the European Athletics Championships. Only British athletes may formally compete, though in some circumstances British club-affiliated foreign athletes may take part as guests.

The event was established in 2007, replacing the AAA Championships as the principal event on the domestic athletics calendar in the United Kingdom. A previous event, the UK Athletics Championships had nominally been the national championship, but in effect took second billing to the "triple A's". The creation of the British Athletics Championships as the main national championship and selection event, brought the governance of the elite level of the sport and team selection firmly under the new national body for the sport, moving away from the Amateur Athletic Association of England, which had served that role since 1880. A 2001 British Championship in women's 3000 metres steeplechase was held as a one-off at Scotstoun Stadium, due to the growing popularity of the event among women and its absence from the AAA Championships programme (the event was added a year later).

Editions

Championships records

Men

Women

See also
 List of British athletics champions

References

 
National athletics competitions
Athletics competitions in the United Kingdom
2007 establishments in the United Kingdom
Recurring sporting events established in 2007